The 1988 Wightman Cup (also known as the 1988 British Car Auctions Wightman Cup for sponsorship reasons) was the 60th edition of the annual women's team tennis competition between the United States and Great Britain. It was held at the Royal Albert Hall in London in England in the United Kingdom and was the final time the competition was staged in Britain.

References

Wightman Cups by year
Wightman Cup
Wightman Cup
Wightman Cup
Wightman Cup
Wightman Cup